Alexander Burns (born 4 August 1973) is a Scottish former footballer who played as a forward for Motherwell, Heracles, Southend United, Livingston, Partick Thistle, among other teams. He later became a police officer.

Career
Burns began his career with junior club Shotts Bon Accord, before joining Motherwell in 1991. Upon departing Fir Park after six years with the Lanarkshire side, in which they finished third in the Scottish Premier Division in 1993–94 and runners-up in 1994–95, he moved around several clubs, rarely spending more than one season at each. Beginning with a spell with Dutch side Heracles Almelo, he signed for English side Southend  and returned to Scotland in 1999, joining second-tier Raith Rovers.

Burns then joined Livingston, and after helping them win promotion to the Scottish Premier League in 2000–01, transferred to St Mirren. 
After scoring a career-best 16 SPL goals with Partick Thistle in 2002–03, he returned to his first club Motherwell for a second spell. 

He had a loan spell with Clyde in 2005, soon turning to part-time football with Brechin City. He joined Stranraer the following season, before dropping out of the senior game to sign for Petershill.

Burns joined Strathclyde Police in 2008 and served as a community officer in North Lanarkshire.

References

External links

Living people
Officers in Scottish police forces
1973 births
Footballers from Bellshill
Scottish footballers
Shotts Bon Accord F.C. players
Motherwell F.C. players
Heracles Almelo players
Southend United F.C. players
Raith Rovers F.C. players
Livingston F.C. players
St Mirren F.C. players
Partick Thistle F.C. players
Petershill F.C. players
Clyde F.C. players
Scottish Junior Football Association players
Brechin City F.C. players
Stranraer F.C. players
Scottish Premier League players
Scottish police officers
Scottish Football League players
Eerste Divisie players
Association football forwards
Scottish expatriate footballers
Expatriate footballers in the Netherlands
Scottish expatriate sportspeople in the Netherlands